, real name , was the leader of the 1st Unit of the Sekihōtai, a group of Japanese political extremists formed in 1868 during the Boshin War.

History

He was born Kojima Shirō in Akasaka, Edo in 1839 as the fourth son to the wealthy father Kojima Hyoma and his wife Yasu.

He married Watanabe Teru, the daughter of the retainer of the Matsudaira clan in 1864 (Genji 1). Their son, Kawajirō, was born in 1865 (Genji 2) whom he was happy with and thought his newly born son was a gift of the divinity of Hikawa Shrine.

After the Battle of Toba–Fushimi in 1868, the Sekihōtai, in which Sagara was the leader of the 1st Unit, constituted of a civilian squad made principally of farmers and merchants, was formed on February 1, 1868 at Kongōrin-ji temple in Matsuoji, Ōmi Province with the support of Saigō Takamori and Iwakura Tomomi. The group promised a reduction in taxes to the people who supported it.

When Sagara was asked to return to his headquarters by the Satchōdo command, Sagara decided not to because he believed it would be too soon. As a result, the Satchōdo forces turned on his unit, and Sagara, along with seven more officers, were arrested on March 24, 1868 by a force under the staff officer Shindō Tatewaki. Sagara had to watch his officers being executed by decapitation one by one before he himself was decapitated at Shimosuwa Station, Nagano Prefecture on March 26, 1868. Their heads were put for display the next morning.

His wife Teru, upon hearing the news, entrusted her son Kawajirō to Sagara's three sisters, and committed suicide soon afterwards. Sagara and his wife were buried on a temple ground in Akasaka. While on display, Sagara's head was later stolen by his close friend and a kokugaku scholar Iida Takesato and was secretly buried.

After their original burial ground at the temple was no longer being kept up, their graves were reburied at Aoyama Cemetery, Akasaka, Tokyo, Japan by the Kimura family.

Legacy

Monument
The Monument to the Memory of Sagara Sōzō or the Sagara-zuka monument was unveiled by Ochiai Naoaki in 1870.

Sagara Festival
In 1918, Sagara's grandson  received cooperation from volunteers in Shimosuwa and revived the memorial festival for Sagara and his unit.

Enshrinement
In 1928, Kimura had since restored his honor and Sagara was enshrined in Yasukuni Shrine, Tokyo by 1929.

In popular culture
Sagara is portrayed in the manga and anime series Rurouni Kenshin, where he is the mentor of Sagara Sanosuke, a fictional character.

The character DJ Sagara of Kamen Rider Gaim is named for Sagara Sōzō.

References

1839 births
1868 deaths
Samurai